Vandu is a village in Kadrina Parish, Lääne-Viru County, in northeastern Estonia.

Estonian Prime Minister and State Elder Otto Strandman (1875–1941) was born in Vandu.

References

 

Villages in Lääne-Viru County
Kreis Wierland